Melinda French Gates (born Melinda Ann French; August 15, 1964) is an American philanthropist and former multimedia product developer and manager at Microsoft. French Gates has consistently been ranked as one of the world's most powerful women by Forbes.

In 2000, she and her then-husband Bill Gates co-founded the Bill & Melinda Gates Foundation, the world's largest private charitable organization as of 2015. She and her ex-husband have been awarded the US Presidential Medal of Freedom and the French Legion of Honour.

In early May 2021, Bill and Melinda Gates announced they were getting divorced but will still remain co-chairs of the foundation. She was recognized as one of the BBC's 100 women of 2021.

Early life
Melinda Ann French was born on August 15, 1964, in Dallas, Texas. She is the second of four children born to Raymond Joseph French Jr., an aerospace engineer, and Elaine Agnes Amerland, a homemaker. She has an older sister and two younger brothers.

French, a Catholic, attended St. Monica Catholic School, where she was the valedictorian of her class. At age 14, French was introduced to the Apple II by her father, and a school teacher named Mrs. Bauer who advocated teaching the students at the all-girls school computer science. It was from this experience she developed her interest in computer games and the BASIC programming language.

French graduated as valedictorian from Ursuline Academy of Dallas in 1982. She earned a bachelor's degree in computer science and economics from Duke University in 1986 and an MBA from Duke's Fuqua School of Business in 1987. At Duke, French was a member of the Kappa Alpha Theta sorority, Beta Rho Chapter.

Career 

French Gates's first job was tutoring children in mathematics and computer programming. After graduation, she became a marketing manager with Microsoft, being responsible for the development of multimedia products. These included Cinemania, Encarta, Publisher, Microsoft Bob, Money, Works (Macintosh) and Word. She worked on Expedia, which became one of the most popular travel booking websites. In the early 1990s, French Gates was appointed as General Manager of Information Products, a position which she held until 1996. She left Microsoft that year, reportedly, to focus on starting a family.

French Gates served as a member of Duke University's Board of Trustees from 1996 to 2003. She attends the annual Bilderberg Group conference and has held a seat on the Board of Directors of Graham Holdings (formerly The Washington Post Company) since 2004. She was also on the board of directors at Drugstore.com but left in August 2006 to focus on philanthropic projects. Since 2000, French Gates has been active in the public eye, stating "As I thought about strong women of history, I realized that they stepped out in some way". This has helped her work become recognized while also shaping and delivering goals of the Bill & Melinda Gates Foundation. By 2014, Bill and Melinda had donated US$28 billion of their personal wealth to the Foundation. In 2015, French Gates founded Pivotal Ventures as a separate, independent organization to identify, help develop and implement innovative solutions to problems affecting U.S. women and families.

Writing
In 2019, French Gates debuted as an author with the book The Moment of Lift: How Empowering Women Changes the World. Former president Barack Obama starred in a comedy sketch in order to promote it. The book highlights the failure to acknowledge women's unpaid work, drawing on feminist economist Dame Marilyn Waring's book If Women Counted.

Personal life

Melinda began dating Microsoft CEO Bill Gates in 1987, after meeting him at a trade fair in New York. In 1994, she married Gates in a private ceremony held in Lanai, Hawaii. They have three children: Jennifer, Rory, and Phoebe Gates. The family resides in an earth-sheltered mansion overlooking Lake Washington in Medina, Washington. The family also owns an oceanfront residence in Del Mar, California.

In May 2021, French Gates and her husband announced in a joint statement on social media their decision to divorce, ending 27 years of marriage, and 34 years as a couple. According to The Wall Street Journal, French Gates had met with divorce lawyers since at least October 2019 after her husband's business dealings with convicted sex offender Jeffrey Epstein became public, and had warned her husband about associating with him as far back as 2013. Although the couple did not have a prenuptial agreement, French Gates (who filed) did not request spousal support; her husband transferred over $2 billion worth of shares and stocks. The divorce was finalized on August 2, 2021.
 In March 2022, Melinda said that she and Bill were "friendly" but "not friends".

Awards and recognition
In 2002, Melinda and Bill Gates received the Award for Greatest Public Service Benefiting the Disadvantaged, an award given out annually by Jefferson Awards.

In December 2005, Melinda and Bill Gates were named by Time as Persons of the Year alongside Bono. Melinda and Bill Gates received the Spanish Prince of Asturias Award for International Cooperation on May 4, 2006, in recognition of their world impact through charitable giving.

In November 2006, French Gates was awarded the Insignia of the Order of the Aztec Eagle, together with Bill, who was awarded the Placard of the same order, both for their philanthropic work around the world in the areas of health and education, particularly in Mexico, and specifically in the program "Un país de lectores".

In May 2006, in honor of her work to improve the lives of children locally and around the world, Seattle Children's Hospital dedicated the Melinda French Gates Ambulatory Care building at Seattle Children's (formerly Children's Hospital and Regional Medical Center). She chaired a campaign for the hospital to fundraise $300 million to expand facilities, fund under-compensated and uncompensated care, and grow the hospital's research program to find cures and treatments.

In 2007, French Gates received an honorary doctorate in medicine from the Karolinska Institute in Stockholm, Sweden. In 2009, she and her husband received honorary degrees from the University of Cambridge. Their benefaction of $210 million in 2000 set up the Gates Cambridge Trust, which funds postgraduate scholars from outside the UK to study at the university. Lastly, she was awarded an honorary Doctor of Humane Letters by Duke University in 2013 as a tribute for her philanthropic commitment.

She was ranked #3 in Forbes 2013, 2014, 2015 and 2017 lists of the 100 Most Powerful Women, #4 in 2012 and 2016, #5 in 2020, and #6 in 2011, 2018, and 2019.

She was awarded the UCSF medal in 2013. French Gates was appointed an honorary Dame Commander of the Order of the British Empire (DBE) in 2013 for services to philanthropy and international development. In recognition of the foundation's philanthropic activities in India, Bill and Melinda jointly received India's third-highest civilian honor, Padma Bhushan, in 2015. In 2016, President Barack Obama awarded French Gates and her husband with the Presidential Medal of Freedom for their philanthropic efforts.

In 2017, President François Hollande awarded France's highest national honour to French Gates and her husband for their charitable efforts, i.e. as Commander of the Legion of Honour. That year, she was awarded the Otto Hahn Peace Medal 2016 of the United Nations Association of Germany (DGVN), Berlin-Brandenburg, "for outstanding services to peace and international understanding" in the historic Berlin Town Hall. That year, French Gates was listed by UK-based company Richtopia at number 12 in the list of 200 Most Influential Philanthropists and Social Entrepreneurs Worldwide.

Women in technology
French Gates's experience of a male-dominated workplace at Microsoft inspired her to encourage more women in the computing field. In September 2016, she announced her desire to increase diversity in the workplace, especially in the technology industry, stating: "Every company needs technology, and yet we're graduating fewer women technologists. That is not good for society. We have to change it." French Gates also spoke about this topic at the 2017 Grace Hopper Celebration of Women in Computing, an annual series of conferences.

She was recognized as one of the BBC's 100 women of 2021.

Bibliography

The Moment of Lift: How Empowering Women Changes the World (2019)

References

External links

 Profile at the Bill & Melinda Gates Foundation
 
 
 
 
 
 Melinda Gates Goes Public, Fortune magazine, January 4, 2008
 Melinda Gates Philanthropic Profile, GiveSmart.org, November 2012
 Melinda Gates  Video produced by Makers: Women Who Make America

1964 births
Living people
21st-century American businesspeople
21st-century American businesswomen
American billionaires
American humanitarians
American nonprofit chief executives
American philanthropists
American women chief executives
American women philanthropists
Bill & Melinda Gates Foundation people
Businesspeople from Dallas
Businesspeople from Seattle
Businesspeople from Texas
Catholics from Texas
Catholics from Washington (state)
Duke University alumni
Fellows of the American Academy of Arts and Sciences
Female billionaires
Fuqua School of Business alumni
Gates family
Giving Pledgers
Honorary Dames Commander of the Order of the British Empire
Microsoft employees
People from Medina, Washington
People from Seattle
Philanthropists from Texas
Philanthropists from Washington (state)
Presidential Medal of Freedom recipients
Recipients of the Cross of Recognition
Recipients of the Padma Bhushan in social work
The Washington Post people
Wired (magazine) people
Women humanitarians
BBC 100 Women